Thomas (the Tank Engine) & Friends is a children's television series about the engines and other characters working on the railways of the Island of Sodor, and is based on The Railway Series books written by the Reverend W. Awdry.

This article lists and details episodes from the eleventh series of this show, which was first broadcast in September 2007 and ended in September 2008. This series was narrated by Michael Angelis for the UK audiences, while Michael Brandon narrates the episodes for the US audiences.

Starting in this series, the theme song was sung by the children from the "Thomas & Friends" suite.

Most episodes in this series have two titles: the original titles from the UK broadcasts are shown on top, while the American-adapted titles are shown underneath.

This was Christopher Skala's first series as executive producer.

For the US broadcasts, this was the last series to be distributed by Connecticut Public Television, which distributed the first few episodes. The rest of the episodes from this Series, and from future series, are distributed by WNET in New York City.   

The original broadcast version only included 20 episodes; the rest were released on DVD (Engines and Escapades) and then were broadcast on TV months later.

Production
Series 11 was the first in the Series to be filmed in high-definition television format. It was also the last series to be filmed entirely with models and to utilize the resin faces in the closeup shots, as well as human figurines; Series 12 utilized a mix of CGI and models prior to the switch to full CGI animation in series 13.

Episodes

Characters

Introduced
 Whiff ("Emily's Rubbish")
 Billy ("Don't Be Silly, Billy")
 Hector ("Hector the Horrid!")
 Madge ("Cool Truckings")

Recurring cast

 Thomas
 Edward
 Henry
 Gordon
 James
 Percy
 Toby
 Emily
 Donald and Douglas
 Bill and Ben
 Diesel
 Mavis
 'Arry and Bert
 Salty
 Arthur
 Spencer
 Molly
 Rosie
 Skarloey
 Rheneas
 Sir Handel
 Peter Sam
 Rusty
 Duncan
 Freddie
 Mighty Mac
 Annie and Clarabel
 Troublesome Trucks
 The Chinese Dragon
 Rocky
 Bertie
 Cranky
 Elizabeth
 The Fat Controller
 Dowager Hatt
 Cyril
 Farmer McColl
 Allicia Botti
 The Duke of Boxford
 Mr. Percival
 Harvey (does not speak)
 Henrietta (does not speak)
 Jeremy (does not speak)
 Lady Hatt (does not speak)
 The Refreshment Lady (does not speak)
 Sodor Brass Band (do not speak)
 The Duchess of Boxford (does not speak)
 Murdoch (not named; does not speak)
 Neville (not named; does not speak)
 Jem Cole (not named; does not speak)
 Butch (cameo)
 Stephen Hatt (cameo)
 Bridget Hatt (cameo)
 Farmer Trotter (cameo)
 Lord Callan (cameo)

References

2007 British television seasons
2008 British television seasons
Thomas & Friends seasons